Teuchoporidae is a family of bryozoans belonging to the order Cheilostomatida.

Genera:
 Coleopora Canu & Bassler, 1927
 Lagenicella Cheetham & Sandberg, 1964
 Laginipora 
 Teuchopora Neviani, 1895

References

Cheilostomatida